Jordan William Sheed (born 24 September 1982 in Timaru, Canterbury) is a New Zealand cricketer who played in the 2002 U-19 Cricket World Cup in New Zealand, and then played for seven seasons for Otago Volts.

See also
 List of Otago representative cricketers

References

1982 births
Living people
New Zealand cricketers
Otago cricketers
Cricketers from Timaru